Uma Aventura na Casa Assombrada is a 2009 Portuguese film directed by Carlos Coelho da Silva.

Cast
 Sara Salgado
 Thales Egidio 
 Francisco Areosa
 Margarida Martinho
 Mariana Martinho
 César Brito

References

External links
 Official website 
 
 Review at Público 

2009 films
Portuguese adventure films
Films based on children's books
Films directed by Carlos Coelho da Silva
Portuguese comedy films